On 20 March 2019, a school bus in Crema, Italy was hijacked by its driver Ousseynou Sy, who attempted to set it on fire. Sy, whose origins are Senegalese, said his motive was to avenge the deaths of African migrants in the Mediterranean Sea. Police freed the children before he set the vehicle on fire. In July 2020, he was sentenced to 24 years in prison for forced confinement with terrorist intent.

Perpetrator
Sy was born in France in 1972, to Senegalese parents. He moved to Italy in 2004, becoming a citizen through marriage to a woman from Brescia. He lost contact with his two children after their separation; he said during his attack that he had three daughters who had drowned in the sea.

Sy worked as a bus driver since 2004. His license was suspended in 2007 for drink driving. In 2010 he sexually assaulted a 17-year-old girl, and received an 18-month suspended sentence in 2018. In the aftermath of his hijack, Italy called for regular checks on school bus drivers' criminal records, as Sy's employers Autoguidovie were unaware of his prior offenses.

Attack
The school bus from Crema was returning from the gymnasium with 51 children, two teachers and a janitor on board when Sy doused the aisle with petrol and announced that he was hijacking it towards Linate Airport in Milan. He gave zip ties to the adults and ordered them to tie up the children.

Some on board managed to ring the police, who attempted to block the bus and to negotiate with Sy. The Carabinieri broke the rear windows to free those on board, at which point Sy lit a lighter and torched the bus. Twelve children were hospitalised with shock, bruising or smoke inhalation.

A 13-year-old boy called Ramy Shehata was hailed as a hero for his part in the rescue. While pretending to pray in Arabic, he rang his father who informed the police. Shehata, whose parents are Egyptian, was not born with Italian citizenship. He was later awarded with citizenship by Interior Minister Matteo Salvini, whose policies are usually anti-migrant.

Investigation
Investigators found that Sy acted alone, and had no connection to Islamic extremism. He had sent videos to friends telling Africans to "rise up", and had bought petrol and restraints in preparation. He was of sound mind when committing the crimes.

In July 2020, Sy was convicted and sentenced to 24 years in prison. In his statement, he denied wrongdoing and railed against Salvini.

References

March 2019 events in Italy
March 2019 crimes in Europe
Crime in Lombardy
Hijacking
Failed terrorist attempts in Italy
Arson in the 2010s
Kidnappings in Italy
Kidnapping in the 2010s